Cristian Mata (born February 25, 1994) is an American soccer player who plays as a forward.

Career

College and amateur
Mata spent two years playing college soccer at the University of Tulsa between 2012 and 2013.

Professional
Mata signed with United Soccer League club Tulsa Roughnecks on June 25, 2015.

References

External links
Golden Hurricane bio

1994 births
Living people
American soccer players
Tulsa Golden Hurricane men's soccer players
FC Tulsa players
Association football forwards
Soccer players from Oklahoma
USL Championship players
Sportspeople from Tulsa, Oklahoma